Stackhousia monogyna, commonly known as creamy stackhousia or creamy candles,is a flowering plant in the family Celastraceae.  It is a small multi-stemmed plant with narrow leaves and terminal spikes of white, cream or yellow flowers. It is a widespread species found in all states of Australia but not the Northern Territory.

Description

Taxonomy and naming
The species was described in 1861 by Ferdinand von Mueller as Desdemodium acanthocladum. In 1805 French naturalist Jacques Labillardière changed the name to Stackhousia monogyna and the description was published in  Novae Hollandiae Plantarum Specimen.The specific epithet (monogyna) means "one", probably referring to the one-seeded fruit.

Distribution and habitat
Creamy stackhousia is a common widespread species growing in grassland and dry forest on gravel, clay and granite in all states of Australia but not the Northern Territory.

References

Stackhousia
Flora of Queensland
Flora of South Australia
Flora of Tasmania
Flora of Victoria (Australia)
Eudicots of Western Australia
Flora of New South Wales